Miss Italia nel Mondo or Miss Italy in the World is an Italian beauty pageant for women of Italian heritage which has been held since 1990. Dozens of countries vie for the crown annually in the pageant held each year in Italy.

Title Holders

Hosts
Fabrizio Frizzi 1991-1993
Paolo Bonolis 1994-1996
Carlo Conti 1997-2002
Amadeus 2003
Eleonora Daniele

Judges
Mara Venier 2010
Daniele Pecci 2010
Gérard Depardieu 2011
Kaspar Capparoni 2011

Notes
 Barbara Clara competed in Miss Venezuela 2004 and placed as the 2nd runner-up.
 Valentina Patruno competed in Miss Venezuela 2003 and won the title of Miss World Venezuela. She placed as semi-finalist in Miss World 2003 in Sanya, China.
 Silvana Santaella competed in the national beauty pageant Miss Venezuela 2003, held on October 16, 2003 in Caracas, where she placed 1st runner-up. She then won Miss Italia nel Mondo 2004. She was crowned Sambil Model / Miss Earth Venezuela 2007 on June 7, 2007 in Caracas, and represented Venezuela at Miss Earth 2007, in which she was crowned Miss Earth-Water (2nd runner-up).
 Silvia Novais competed in Miss Brasil 2009, and she placed among the top 15 semi-finalists.

External links
 Official Website

Beauty pageants in Italy
Recurring events established in 1991
Italian awards
Beauty pageants for people of specific ethnic or national descents
Italian diaspora
1991 establishments in Italy